Lorenzo Robitaille (May 27, 1882 – August 14, 1952) was a Canadian politician.

Born in Beauport, Quebec, the son of Alfred and Elizabeth (née Lynotte) Robitaille, he was educated at the Mount St. Louis College at Montreal. He was in partnership with his father in the distillery business at Quebec and Beauport and owner of a Sugar and Vegetable preserve faction at St. Johns, Quebec. He was chosen Secretary of the Manufacturers Association of the Province of Quebec. He was elected to the House of Commons of Canada for the riding of Quebec County in a 1906 by-election caused by the appointment of Charles Fitzpatrick as Chief Justice of Canada. An Independent Liberal, Robitaille defeated the official Liberal candidate but went on to be defeated in the 1908 election.

Electoral history

References

 The Canadian Parliament; biographical sketches and photo-engravures of the senators and members of the House of Commons of Canada. Being the tenth Parliament, elected November 3, 1904

External links
 

1882 births
1952 deaths
Independent Liberal MPs in Canada
Members of the House of Commons of Canada from Quebec
Politicians from Quebec City